Hölzle (German pronunciation: [ˈhœltslɛ]) is a German surname. Notable people with the surname include:

Frank Hölzle (born 1968), German surgeon
Urs Hölzle, Swiss software engineer and technology executive

See also
Holle (surname)

German-language surnames